Angelika Knipping (born January 7, 1961) is a retired female breaststroke swimmer from Germany, who won a gold medal at the 1981 Summer Universiade in Bucharest. She represented West Germany at the 1984 Summer Olympics in Los Angeles, California.

References
 sports-reference

1961 births
Living people
German female swimmers
German female breaststroke swimmers
Olympic swimmers of West Germany
Swimmers at the 1984 Summer Olympics
Universiade medalists in swimming
Sportspeople from Hagen
University of Alabama alumni
Universiade gold medalists for West Germany
Medalists at the 1981 Summer Universiade